Kalateh-ye Mirza may refer to:
 Kalateh-ye Mirza, Darmian, South Khorasan
 Kalateh-ye Mirza, Ferdows, South Khorasan
 Kalateh-ye Mirza, Khusf, South Khorasan

See also
 Kalateh-ye Mirza Abbas
 Kalateh-ye Mirza Jani
 Kalateh-ye Mirza Mohammad Ali
 Kalateh-ye Mirza Rajab
 Kalateh-ye Mirza Rahim